Below are the rosters for the UNCAF Nations Cup 2003 tournament in Panama, held from February 19 to 27 2003.

Head coach:  Julio César Cortés

Head coach:  José de la Paz Herrera

Head coach:  Maurizio Battistini

Head coach:  Steve Sampson

Head coach:  Juan Ramón Paredes

Head coach:  Carlos Alberto Daluz

External links
Tournament details at RSSSF

Copa Centroamericana squads
squads